Noah Bowman (born May 8, 1992) is a Canadian freestyle skier. He won a silver medal in the superpipe at Winter X Games XVI.

On January 24, 2022, Bowman was named to Canada's 2022 Olympic team.

References

External links

1992 births
Living people
Canadian male freestyle skiers
Superpipe skiers
Olympic freestyle skiers of Canada
Freestyle skiers at the 2014 Winter Olympics
Freestyle skiers at the 2018 Winter Olympics
Freestyle skiers at the 2022 Winter Olympics
X Games athletes
Skiers from Calgary